Peruvians in France, who form part of the larger Latin American community in France. In 2012, the stock of Peruvian-born immigrants was the third largest amongst all Latin American immigrants to France.

Demographics

According to the "Migration Report of 2012", 22,002 Peruvian-born people were living in France. Peruvian immigrants to France, they do so mostly work and studies, this community is noticeable in large cities such as Paris, Lyon and Montpellier.

Peruvian community in France

Peruvians form the third largest Latin American community in France, after Brazilians and Venezuelans, and it is one of the fastest-growing.

Religions

In the 2007 census, 81.3% of the population over 12 years old described themselves as Catholic, 12.5% as Evangelical, 3.3% as of other denominations, and 2.9% as non-religious.[26] Lord of Miracles is a mural painted by a black slave in the 17th century of Jesus Christ that is venerated in Lima and the main Catholic festivity in Peru and one of the biggest processions around the world. Every year, in October, hundreds of thousands of faithful from all races and economic backgrounds dresses in purple to celebrate the also known "Black Christ" in a religious procession through the streets of Lima. Without doubt the earthquakes by Lima during the 17th and 18th Centuries, which destroyed most of the city leaving only that mural standing up, contributed to the growth and the solidification of devoted veneration to the mural known as "Christ of Pachacamilla", In conclusion it is a mainly Catholic country.

Notable people

See also
 France–Peru relations
 French Peruvian
 Immigration to France

References

 
France